Kåre Hedebrant (born 28 June 1995) is a Swedish actor.

Early life
He lives in Hässelby, near Stockholm. Hedebrant attended Kungsholmens Gymnasium's Choir Section, and during middle school he attended the Adolf Fredrik's Music School.

Career
In 2005, he played the title role of Emil in Emil i Lönneberga, a theatrical production based on the popular children's novels by Astrid Lindgren.

In 2007, after an open casting involving 4,000 children, Hedebrant was chosen to play the role of Oskar in Let the Right One In.

Oskar, the protagonist of the film, is a 12-year-old bullied boy who strikes up a friendship with the mysterious Eli (Lina Leandersson), who later turns out to be a vampire. Hedebrant received generally positive notices for his role. According to If magazine's reviewer, "Hedebrant does a fine job of conveying the boy's silent longing, rage and defiance". James Berardinelli considered him an "interesting choice to play Oskar", and noted that he "effectively makes the character seem remote, withdrawn, and a little creepy".
According to Hedebrant, "[e]ven the bully scenes weren't hard to shoot because I got on very well with both guys ... [t]he main problem was that it was so cold!"

He received a nomination for "Best Performance in an International Feature Film – Leading Young Performers" (with Lina Leandersson), in the 30th Annual Young Artist Awards. Other nominations include "Breakthrough Performer" from the Online Film Critics Society Awards 2008 (won by Lina Leandersson), and "Best Actor" in the 2009 Fangoria Chainsaw Awards (won by Ron Perlman).

In 2010, Hedebrant was chosen as the lead role in Amors Baller, a Norwegian romantic comedy directed by Kristoffer Metcalfe. Hedebrant plays Lucas, a Swedish teenager who moves to a small Norwegian town, and falls in love with the goalkeeper on the local girls football team. The film premiered in Norway on 25 March 2011. In 2012, he played the role of Tobias in the Swedish sci-fi drama series Real Humans.

Hedebrant is member of a band called The Broadcasting Service, who play alternative rock, "stuff like The Hives".

Filmography

Awards and nominations

References

External links

1995 births
Living people
Male actors from Stockholm
Swedish male child actors
Swedish male film actors
Swedish male television actors
21st-century Swedish male actors